VRI may refer to:

Volunteers for Rural India, a UK charity
Viewpoints Research Institute, nonprofit public benefit organization
Victoria Regina Imperatrix, Latin for Victoria, Queen and Empress
Video remote interpreting, a remote interpreting service for the deaf and hard of hearing
VRI Fencing Club, Australian fencing club
Vejlby-Risskov Idrætsklub, a Danish sports club mostly known for its association football and handball departments
Vriddhachalam Junction railway station, Virudhachalam, Tamil Nadu, India (Indian Railways station code)